Pietro Amenta (born 18 November 1962) is an Italian catholic clergyman and jurist who was a judge of the Vatican's highest appellate court, the Roman Rota, from 2012 to 2018. In February, 2018, he appeared in a criminal court facing charges of sexual molestation and possession of child pornography. He was found guilty and a suspended sentence of fourteen months was imposed.

References 

1962 births
21st-century Italian criminals
Canon law jurists
21st-century Italian judges
Italian legal scholars
18th-century Italian Roman Catholic priests
Living people
People convicted of child pornography offenses